Jerusalem crickets (or potato bugs) are a group of large, flightless insects in the genera Ammopelmatus and Stenopelmatus, together comprising the tribe Stenopelmatini. The former genus is native to the western United States and parts of Mexico, while the latter genus is from Central America.

Despite their common names, these insects are neither true crickets (which belong to the family Gryllidae) nor true bugs (which belong to the order Hemiptera), nor are they native to Jerusalem. These nocturnal insects use their strong mandibles to feed primarily on dead organic matter but can also eat other insects. Their highly adapted feet are used for burrowing beneath moist soil to feed on decaying root plants and tubers.

While Jerusalem crickets are not venomous, they can emit a foul smell and are capable of inflicting a painful bite.

Classification 
There are 19 species recognized as valid in the genus Stenopelmatus, as presently delimited (with 13 more of uncertain status and potentially not valid), though the genus was formerly much larger, including most of the species now placed in the genus Ammopelmatus, which contains 20 additional species. The family Stenopelmatidae and subfamily Stenopelmatinae contain several Old World genera, but only the genera in the tribe Stenopelmatini (all New World) are referred to as Jerusalem crickets. Other families in the same superfamily (Stenopelmatoidea) in Australia and New Zealand include the wētā and king crickets. They are similar to stenopelmatines in many respects.

Communication 

Similar to true crickets, each species of Jerusalem cricket produces a different song during mating. This song takes the form of a characteristic drumming in which the insect beats its abdomen against the ground.

No species have wings with sound-producing structures; moreover, evidently none has structures it could use to hear sound. This contrasts with true crickets and katydids, who use their wings to produce sounds and have hearing organs to sense sounds of others. Jerusalem crickets seem unable to hiss by forcing air through their spiracles, as some beetles and cockroaches do. Instead, the few Jerusalem crickets that do make sound rub their hind legs against the sides of the abdomen, producing a rasping, hissing noise. This hiss may serve to deter predators rather than to communicate with other crickets. For such purposes, Jerusalem crickets rely on substrate vibrations felt by subgenual organs located in all six of the insect's legs.

Names 

Several hypotheses attempt to explain the origin of the term "Jerusalem cricket". One suggests the term originated from a mixing of Navajo and Christian terminology, resulting from the strong connection Franciscan priests had with the Navajos in developing their dictionary and vocabulary. Such priests may have heard the Navajos speak of a "skull insect" and took this as a reference to Calvary (also known as Skull Hill) outside Jerusalem near the place where Jesus was  crucified.

Several Navajo names refer to the insect's head:
c’ic’in lici "red-skull"
c’os bic’ic lici "red-skull bug"
c’ic’in lici’ I coh "big red-skull"
wo se c’ini or rositsini or yo sic’ini (/) "skull insect"

References 

Stenopelmatoidea
Orthoptera tribes